Sergey Rusetsky (born 8 March 1989) is a Belarusian football coach and former player. Since 2020 he is a head coach of women's club Zorka-BDU Minsk.

Career
Rusetsky began his career playing for the third level side Zvezda-BGU Minsk. In early 2008 he switched to Czech side FK Baník Most.

From 2008 to 2011 he was a player of the Czech club FK Baník Most of the second division. In 2009 he was loaned at Chomutov. In 2012 he returned to Zvezda-BGU Minsk. In the same year he played for the Swedish football club Brage.

At the beginning of 2013, he again became a player of Zvezda-BGU Minsk, but was soon loaned by Minsk, where he played only one match and left the team in the summer due to injury.

In August 2014, he became a player of Dnepr Mogilev. Since 2015, he again began to play for Zvezda-BGU Minsk. He missed most of the 2016 season due to injury.

In the first half of 2018, he played for Buxoro. In July he returned to Belarus and began to play for Smolevichi. In January 2019, he moved to NFK Minsk and left the team in August.

In total, he played 21 matches in the Belarusian Premier League.

References

External links
 
 

1989 births
Living people
Belarusian footballers
Belarusian expatriate footballers
Association football midfielders
Expatriate footballers in the Czech Republic
Expatriate footballers in Sweden
Expatriate footballers in Uzbekistan
FC Energetik-BGU Minsk players
FK Baník Most players
IK Brage players
FC Minsk players
FC Dnepr Mogilev players
Buxoro FK players
FC Smolevichi players
FC Krumkachy Minsk players
Belarusian football managers